Einar Eriksen (4 March 1933 – 16 January 2021) was a Norwegian newspaper editor.

Biography
He was born in Bergen. He worked in Os- og Fanaposten from 1952, and was hired in Bergens Tidende in 1955. He was awarded the Narvesen Prize in 1964. He advanced to subeditor in 1978 and news editor in 1981, and was editor-in-chief from 1986 to 1991.

References

1933 births
2021 deaths
Journalists from Bergen
Norwegian newspaper editors
Bergens Tidende editors